Razgrad Municipality is a municipality (obshtina) in Razgrad Province, Northeastern Bulgaria, located in the Ludogorie geographical region part of the Danubian Plain. It is named after its administrative centre - the city of Razgrad which is also the capital of the province.

The main road E70 crosses the area, connecting the main town with the city of Ruse and the Danube Bridge.

Settlements 

Razgrad Municipality includes the following 22 places (towns are shown in bold):

Demography 
The following table shows the change of the population during the last four decades.

See also
Provinces of Bulgaria
Municipalities of Bulgaria
List of cities and towns in Bulgaria

References

External links
 Official website 

Municipalities in Razgrad Province